Noor Ariff (born 6 September 1998) is a Singaporean footballer currently playing as a midfielder  for Geylang International.

Career 
He made his debut for the Eagles in 2016 in Geylang's 2-0 win over Balestier Khasa in The New Paper League Cup.

Career statistics

Club

References

Living people
1998 births
Malaysian footballers
Singapore Premier League players
Geylang International FC players
Balestier Khalsa FC players
Association football midfielders